The Council Bluffs Community School District is a public school district headquartered in the city of Council Bluffs, Iowa, United States.

The district serves most of the city of Council Bluffs and the cities of Carter Lake and Crescent.

Schools
All campuses are located in the city of Council Bluffs unless otherwise noted.

Senior high schools
Abraham Lincoln High School
Thomas Jefferson High School

Middle schools
Kirn Middle School
Woodrow Wilson Middle School

Elementary schools
Amelia Bloomer Elementary School
Carter Lake Elementary School (Carter Lake)
College View Elementary School
Crescent Elementary School (Crescent)
Thomas Edison Elementary School
Benjamin Franklin Elementary School
Herbert Hoover Elementary School
Lewis & Clark Elementary School
Longfellow Elementary School
Theodore Roosevelt Elementary School
James B. Rue Elementary School

Other campuses
Kanesville Alternative Learning Center
Tucker Center

Student demographics
The following figures are as of February 2009.

Total District Enrollment: 9,246
Student enrollment by gender
Female: 4,520 (48.89%)
Male: 4,726 (51.11%)
Student enrollment by ethnicity
White: 7,672 (82.98%)
Hispanic: 1,070 (11.57%)
African American: 338 (3.66%)
Asian: 87 (0.94%)
Native American: 79 (0.85%)

See also
List of school districts in Iowa

References

External links
Council Bluffs Community School District – Official website

School districts in Iowa
Council Bluffs, Iowa
Education in Pottawattamie County, Iowa